The Contender is an American reality television series that initially aired from March 3, 2005 to January 7, 2009 on NBC, ESPN, and Versus and currently airs on Epix. Each season of the series follows a group of boxers as they compete with one another in an elimination-style competition, while their lives and relationships with each other and their families are depicted.

The series was created and executive produced by Mark Burnett. The first three seasons of the show were hosted by Sugar Ray Leonard, who shared hosting duties in the first season with actor Sylvester Stallone. Leonard departed the series after season three and Tony Danza joined as his replacement.

On January 22, 2018, it was announced that the series was being revived by premium cable network Epix for a fifth season which premiered on August 24, 2018.

Premise
The show takes the format of a gameshow, with the boxers divided into two teams based on their place of residence in the United States: East Coast or West Coast (or simply “East” and “West”). These teams live together in group living quarters, in Pasadena, California in the historic Royal Laundry Building on Raymond Avenue, and compete for the right to choose which of their team members fights that week, and who he fights against. Most of the second half of the hour-long episodes are devoted to that fight: the loser is eliminated.

Production
The series’ tagline is “The Next Great Human Drama”, and its soundtrack was scored by Hans Zimmer. Before the show premiered, rival US television Fox network rushed to air a competing show The Next Great Champ, hosted by Oscar De La Hoya. The show performed very poorly, with the final episodes being relegated to cable FSN. In an effort to distance itself from the Fox disaster, NBC opted to hold airing its show until spring 2005.

On May 16, 2005, the series was cancelled. The first season cost NBC $2,000,000 per episode. Reruns were seen on CNBC. On August 11, 2005, ESPN announced that it was picking up the rights to a second season of the show, which began airing on the network in July 2006, although special editions under the Contender title are currently airing as of March, 2006. ESPN also announced that it has options to renew the series for two additional seasons. However, on April 10, 2008, ESPN announced that it was canceling the series. Executive producer Jeff Wald maintained that the show would continue on another network. It was later announced the show would move to Versus.

Najai Turpin suicide
On February 14, 2005, one of the 16 contenders, Najai Turpin, despondent over personal matters, committed suicide, shooting himself while sitting with his girlfriend in a parked car outside the West Philadelphia gym where he trained. In his memory, the producers set up a trust fund for his daughter Anyae. The show still aired in its entirety, but with a special tribute to Turpin.

Seasons

Broadcast
The show ran for fifteen weeks through 2005 on NBC in the United States of America.  The show ran in the UK on ITV2 and was repeated later in the week on ITV, and now airs on ITV4.  It also aired on AXN in India, and on the Spanish language network Telemundo. The second season, featuring welterweight contenders, premiered in the U.S. on Tuesday, July 18, 2006, at 10 pm ET/PT, on ESPN. The third season, featuring super middleweight contenders, premiered in the U.S. on Tuesday, September 4, 2007, at 10 pm ET/PT, on ESPN. The fourth season, featuring cruiserweight contenders, premiered in the U.S. on Wednesday, December 3, 2008, at 10 pm ET/PT, on Versus. A fifth season produced by Mark Burnett and hosted by Andre Ward aired on Epix in 2018.

International versions

See also
 The Contender Challenge: UK vs. USA

References

External links
 Official Epix era website
 

 
2000s American reality television series
2005 American television series debuts
2009 American television series endings
2010s American reality television series
2018 American television series debuts
American sports television series
NBC original programming
ESPN original programming
NBCSN shows
MGM+ original programming
English-language television shows
Television series by DreamWorks Television
Television series by MGM Television
American television series revived after cancellation
Television series created by Mark Burnett
Television series by Paramount Television
2018 American television series endings